Joshua Breakstone (born July 22, 1955) is an American jazz guitarist.

Breakstone came into contact with the music business early in life through his parents and siblings. His sister was a lighting technician at the Fillmore East theater, where he saw musicians such as Jimi Hendrix and Frank Zappa. Later, he became interested in jazz and was influenced by Charlie Parker and Lee Morgan. He studied with guitarist Sal Salvador in Manhattan. In 1972, he enrolled at the New College of the University of South Florida and graduated three years later. He continued studies at Berklee College of Music.

After living in Brazil for a few months, he returned to New York City, where he performed and taught. In 1979, he recorded with Canadian saxophonist Glen Hall, with Joanne Brackeen, Cecil McBee, and Billy Hart participating. Until 1983, when he recorded his debut album, he worked with Vinnie Burke, Warne Marsh, Emily Remler, and Aaron Bell. He taught privately and at the Rhode Island Conservatory of Music.

Beginning in 1986, Breakstone recorded four albums for Contemporary Records, with sidemen including Pepper Adams, Kenny Barron, Dennis Irwin, Jimmy Knepper, Tommy Flanagan, Keith Copeland, and Kenny Washington. In 1986 he went on his first tour of Japan. Since then, Breakstone has played twice a year in Japan. He has worked with Terumasa Hino, Monkey Kobayashi, and Eiji Nakamura. In 1991, he signed a contract with the Japanese label King Records, which released four albums: Walk Don't Run (with interpretations of Shadows and Ventures numbers such as "Telstar" and "Apache") and I Want to Hold Your Hand and Oh! Darling, two albums with Beatles compositions.

On Remembering Grant Green (Evidence, 1996), he worked with organist Jack McDuff and the drummer Al Harewood, who had been sideman for guitarist Grant Green. His album Sittin' on the Thing with Ming (Capri, 1994) contained many of his compositions. He followed that album with tributes to Thelonious Monk, Wes Montgomery, and Bud Powell. In 2005, the album Memoirs - The French Sessions, Vol. 2 was produced in France.

Discography

References

Sources 
 Richard Cook and Brian Morton: The Penguin Guide to Jazz Recordings, 8th Edition, London, Penguin, 2006 

American jazz guitarists
Guitarists from New Jersey
People from Elizabeth, New Jersey
1955 births
Living people
20th-century American guitarists
Double-Time Records artists
Contemporary Records artists